Dowlatabad (also Romanized as Dowlatābād and Daulatābād) is a city and capital of Borkhar County, Isfahan Province, Iran.  At the 2006 census, its population was 33,941, in 8,661 families.

References

Populated places in Borkhar County

Cities in Isfahan Province